Amila Gunawardene (born 11 April 1980) is a Sri Lankan cricketer. He played eleven first-class and four List A matches for Chilaw Marians Cricket Club between 2001 and 2003.

See also
 List of Chilaw Marians Cricket Club players

References

External links
 

1980 births
Living people
Sri Lankan cricketers
Chilaw Marians Cricket Club cricketers
Place of birth missing (living people)